Pott's Ford Bridge is a bridge 1/2 mile south of Glasco, Kansas, USA that spans the Solomon River in Cloud County, Kansas. It has a wooden deck with three bowstring pony trusses and one Pratt pony truss. It was built in 1884 by the Wrought Iron Bridge Company of Canton, Ohio.

The bridge is listed on the National Register of Historic Places.

See also
 National Register of Historic Places listings in Cloud County, Kansas

References

 Historic Bridges of the United States (with photos and map) http://bridgehunter.com/ks/cloud/potts-ford/
 Cloud County Road and Bridge Department http://www.cloudcountyks.org/MV2Base.asp?VarCN=5

Buildings and structures in Cloud County, Kansas
Bridges completed in 1884
Road bridges on the National Register of Historic Places in Kansas
Tourist attractions in Cloud County, Kansas
National Register of Historic Places in Cloud County, Kansas
Wrought iron bridges in the United States
Bowstring truss bridges in the United States
Pratt truss bridges in the United States